B Division, Division B, or variant may refer to:

 B Division (New York City Subway)
 B Division (Irish League), association football
 Division B (Scottish Football League)
 Divizia B (Romanian Football League)
 Moldovan "B" Division
 B-Division (Tuvalu)
 Division B (FIBA EuroBasket)
 Division B (Minor Hockey League), Russian ice hockey
 Homicide: Division B, a 2008 short film

See also
 A Division (disambiguation)
 Second Division (disambiguation)